WGRV (1340 AM, "Hometown Radio") is a radio station broadcasting a News Talk Information format. Licensed to Greeneville, Tennessee, United States, the station is currently owned by Radio Greeneville, Inc. and features programming from CNN Radio and Westwood One.

WGRV also has its own television station on Comcast Cable, channel 18, which shows local events and simulcasts WGRV's live shows and newscasts.

References

External links
 

News and talk radio stations in the United States
GRV
Greene County, Tennessee